ASOS Rainbow Athletic Club (commonly known as ASOS Rainbow AC or Rainbow, formerly NBP Rainbow) is an Indian professional football club based in Kolkata, West Bengal, that competes in the Calcutta Premier Division A. In 2018, they competed in the I-League 2nd Division, the second tier of Indian football league system.

History
The team was founded in 1956 as Baranagore Rainbow Club, then later renamed as NBP Rainbow AC.  The team has not been as successful as their city rivals, East Bengal Club, Mohun Bagan, Mohammedan Sporting and Peerless SC. Rainbow participates in the Calcutta Football League premier divisions.

In 2020, Rainbow entered into a partnership with Indian conglomerate Aditya Group. It was announced that the new combination will have former India international Debjit Ghosh as their technical director.

Stadium

Rainbow club plays all their home matches of Calcutta Football League in Barasat Stadium, which is located in Barasat, North 24 Parganas. It is as known as Vidyasagar Krirangan. The stadium has a seating capacity of nearly 22,000 spectators.

Kit manufacturers and shirt sponsors

Current squad

First-team squad

Record

Key
Tms. = Number of teams
Pos. = Position in league
Attendance/G = Average league attendance

Honours
CFL Premier Division B
Runners-up (2): 2016, 2022

See also
 Football in Kolkata
 List of football clubs in Kolkata
 Calcutta Premier Division League

References

External links
 

Association football clubs established in 1956
Football clubs in Kolkata
1956 establishments in West Bengal
I-League 2nd Division clubs